Mourn the Southern Skies is the third studio album by American metal band Exhorder, released on September 20, 2019 through Nuclear Blast. It is the band's first studio release in 27 years, after their 1992 album The Law. This is also the last album to feature founding guitarist Vinnie LaBella, who left the band in February 2020, and their only album with guitarist Marzi Montazeri, who would leave Exhorder two years later.

Overview
In November 2017, Exhorder reunited after a six-year hiatus under a new management deal with the All Independent Service Alliance (AISA). A new lineup was formed, with guitarist Marzi Montazeri (formerly of Superjoint Ritual and Philip H. Anselmo & The Illegals), bassist Jason VieBrooks (formerly of Heathen and Grip Inc.), and drummer Sasha Horn of Forbidden, with vocalist Kyle Thomas and guitarist Vinnie LaBella as the only two remaining original members. In February 2018, they performed two shows at the Saint Vitus Bar in Brooklyn, New York City, and later that year, they signed with Nuclear Blast. In July 2019, the band released the single "My Time", and announced that Mourn the Southern Skies is to be released on September 20, 2019.

The album contains a re-recording of "Ripping Flesh", a song taken from their 1986 demo album Get Rude. Chris Nail, former drummer of the band, played drums on the re-recording.

Track listing

Personnel
Credits are adapted from the album's liner notes.

Exhorder
 Kyle Thomas – vocals
 Vinnie LaBella – lead guitar
 Marzi Montazeri – rhythm guitar
 Jason VieBrooks – bass
 Sasha Horn - drums

Additional musicians
 Mikey "B3" Burkart – organ 
 Chris Nail – drums 

Production
 Vinnie LaBella – executive production
 Duane Simoneaux – production, recording
 Jens Bogren – mixing, mastering
 Tony Lindgren – mastering
 Travis Smith – artwork
 Dante Torrieri – photography

Charts

References

External links
Mourn the Southern Skies at nuclearblast.com

2019 albums
Exhorder albums
Nuclear Blast albums